is a Japanese biochemist. He is known for the discovery and development of hundreds of pharmaceuticals originally occurring in microorganisms. In 2015, he was awarded the Nobel Prize in Physiology or Medicine jointly with William C. Campbell for their role in the discovery of avermectins and ivermectin, the world's first endectocide and a safe and highly effective microfilaricide. It is believed that the large molecular size of ivermectin prevents it from crossing the blood/aqueous humour barrier, and renders the drug an important treatment of helminthically-derived blindness.

Early life and education 
Satoshi Ōmura was born in Nirasaki, Yamanashi Japan in 1935, the second son of Ōmura family. After graduating from the University of Yamanashi in 1958, he was appointed to science teacher at Tokyo Metropolitan Sumida Tech High School. In 1960, he became an auditor of Koji Nakanishi’s course at Tokyo University of Education, one year later, he enrolled in the Tokyo University of Science (TUS) and studied sciences. Ōmura received his M.S. degree from TUS and his Ph.D. in Pharmaceutical Sciences from the University of Tokyo (1968, a Dissertation PhD) and a Ph.D. in Chemistry at TUS (1970).

Career 
Since 1965 Ōmura served at Kitasato Institute system. From 1970 to 1990, he also became a part-time lecturer at Tokyo University of Science.

In 1971 while he was a visiting professor at Wesleyan University, he consulted the chairman of the American Chemical Society, Max Tishler, at an international conference. Together they successfully acquired research expenses from Merck & Co. Ōmura was considering continuing his research in the United States, but ultimately he decided to return to Japan.

In 1973, he became a director of the antibiotic laboratory at Kitasato University, and he also started collaborative research with Merck & Co.

In 1975, he became professor of Kitasato University School of Pharmacy. Meanwhile, the Ōmura laboratory raised many researchers and produced 31 university professors and 120 doctors.

At present date, Ōmura is professor emeritus at Kitasato University and Max Tishler Professor of Chemistry at Wesleyan University.

Research 

Satoshi Ōmura is known for the discovery and development of various pharmaceuticals originally occurring in microorganisms. He was awarded the 2015 Nobel Prize in Physiology or Medicine jointly with William C. Campbell and Tu Youyou for discoveries concerning a novel therapy against infections caused by roundworm parasites. More precisely, his research group isolated a strain of Streptomyces avermitilis that produce the anti-parasitical compound avermectin. Campbell later acquired these bacteria and developed the derived drug ivermectin that was first commercialised for veterinary use in 1981 later put to human use against Onchocerciasis in 1987–88 with the name Mectizan, and is today used against river blindness, lymphatic filariasis, scabies and other parasitic infections.

Since the 1970s, Ōmura has discovered more than 480 new compounds, of which 25 kinds of drugs and reagents are in use. Examples include andrastin, herbimycin, neoxaline as well as: 
a specific inhibitor of protein kinase named staurosporine;
a proteasome inhibitor named lactacystin;
a fatty acid biosynthesis inhibitor named cerulenin;

Furthermore, compounds having a unique structure and biological activity discovered by Omura are drawing attention in drug discovery research, and new anticancer drugs and the like have been created.

Selected publications

Social role 
Ōmura served as deputy director and director at the Kitasato Institute. He was devoted to rebuild the laboratory and promoting the establishment of the medical center that is now Kitasato University Medical Center. Meanwhile, he established a path to rebuilding of the corporate school juridical person, which has integrated with the School corporation Kitasato Gakuen. He succeeded in establishing a new "School corporation Kitasato Institute". In addition, he served as president of the School corporation Joshibi University of Art and Design twice, and served as the honorary school chief of the School corporation Kaichi Gakuen. In 2007, he established the Nirasaki Omura Art Museum on his collection.

Awards and honors 

A Children's statues leading to adults of onchocerciasis before Kitasato University buildings were produced by sculptors of Burkina Faso in honor of Ōmura's contributions of avermectin and ivermectin, a symbol of the campaign to eradicate onchocerciasis. Similar life-sized bronze statues were erected in World Health Organization (WHO) Headquarters, Carter Center, Merck & Co., World Bank Headquarters, and Burkina Faso's World Health Organization Africa Onchocerciasis Control Program.

 1985 – Hoechst-Roussel Award
 1986 – The Pharmaceutical Society of Japan Award
 1988 – Uehara Prize
 1990 – Japan Academy Prize (academics)
 1992 – Medal with Purple Ribbon
 1995 – Fujihara Award
 1997 – Robert Koch Gold Medal
 1998 – Prince Mahidol Award
 2000 – Nakanishi Prize (American Chemical Society and Chemical Society of Japan)
 2005 – Ernest Guenther Award in the Chemistry of Natural Products (American Chemical Society)
 2007 – Hamao Umezawa Memorial Award
 2008 – Knight of the Legion of Honour of France
 2010 – Tetrahedron Prize for Creativity in Organic Chemistry
 2011 – Arima Award
 2011 – Order of the Sacred Treasure, Gold and Silver Star
 2012 – Person of Cultural Merit
 2014 – Canada Gairdner Global Health Award
 2015 – Asahi Prize
 2015 – The Order of Cultural Merit
 2015 – Nobel Prize in Physiology or Medicine

Honorary doctorates 
List of honorary doctorates:
 1992 – Lajos Kossuth University, Hungary
 1994 – Wesleyan University, USA
 2016 – Shanghai Jiao Tong University, China
 2018 – University of St Andrews, Scotland

Learned societies membership

 1992 – Academy of Sciences Leopoldina
 1999 – National Academy of Sciences
 2001 – Japan Academy
 2002 – Académie des sciences
 2005 – Russian Academy of Sciences
 2005 – Royal Society of Chemistry
 2005 – Academia Europaea
 2006 – Chinese Academy of Engineering
 2009 – Japan Society for Bioscience, Biotechnology and Agrochemistry
 2014 – 
 2016 – Japan Pharmaceutical Association
 2016 – Japan Society of Synthetic Organic Chemistry
 2016 – Japan Society of Chemotherapy

See also 
 Lactacystin, Cerulenin, Andrastin A, Herbimycin, and Neoxaline
 Koji Nakanishi
 Tohru Fukuyama
 Kitasato Shibasaburō
 List of Japanese Nobel laureates
 List of Nobel laureates affiliated with the University of Tokyo

References

External links
 Professor Satoshi Omura
 Satoshi Ōmura | People | THE KITASATO INSTITUTE
 Nirasaki Omura Art Museum
 Satoshi Ōmura Quotes With Pictures
 

1935 births
Living people
Japanese Nobel laureates
Nobel laureates in Physiology or Medicine
Foreign associates of the National Academy of Sciences
Members of the French Academy of Sciences
Recipients of the Order of the Sacred Treasure, 2nd class
Recipients of the Medal with Purple Ribbon
Chevaliers of the Légion d'honneur
Japanese biochemists
Japanese inventors
People from Yamanashi Prefecture
Tokyo University of Science alumni
University of Tokyo alumni
Wesleyan University faculty
Japanese art collectors
Museum founders
Recipients of the Order of Culture
Foreign members of the Chinese Academy of Engineering